Khode Bangar is a village in Batala in Gurdaspur district of Punjab State, India. The village is administrated by Sarpanch, an elected representative of the village.

Demography 
, The village has a total number of 111 houses and the population of 659 of which 343 are males while 316 are females.  According to the report published by Census India in 2011, out of the total population of the village, 210 people are from Schedule Caste and the village does not have any Schedule Tribe population so far.

See also
List of villages in India

References

External links 
 Tourism of Punjab
 Census of Punjab

Villages in Gurdaspur district